Jordan James McIntosh (born December 20, 1995) is a Canadian country singer-songwriter from Ottawa, Ontario. He has released a number of singles.

Career
He was born to Greg and Julie McIntosh in Ottawa, Ontario. He has an older sister Melissa. He is presently based in Carleton Place.

McIntosh's first single, "Walk Away", was released in August 2012, followed by "Let Me Love You", "Grew Up in a Country Song", "That Girl" and "Story of My Life" which featured George Canyon. He also was featured on Canyon's Christmas song "Home for Christmas", which also included Aaron Pritchett and One More Girl.

McIntosh won Ottawa Idol (formerly called Kiwanis Idol) in 2011. McIntosh won the 2014 Country Music Association of Ontario award for Rising Star. He was a finalist in the Emerging Artist Showcase presented by Sirius XM Canada at the Boots and Hearts Music Festival.

Discography

Studio albums

Singles

Music videos

Awards and nominations

References

External links
Official website

1995 births
Canadian country singer-songwriters
Canadian male singer-songwriters
Living people
Musicians from Ottawa
21st-century Canadian male singers